Lot 28 is a township in Prince County, Prince Edward Island, Canada.  It is part of St. David's Parish. Lot 28 was awarded to Samuel Holland in the 1767 land lottery.

Communities

Incorporated municipalities:

 Borden-Carleton
 Crapaud
 Victoria

Civic address communities:

 Albany
 Augustine Cove
 Borden-Carleton
 Cape Traverse
 Crapaud
 Lady Fane
 Maple Plains
 Mount Tryon
 North Tryon
 Tryon
 Victoria

References

28
Geography of Prince County, Prince Edward Island